Yevgeny Eduardovich Grachyov (born 11 December 2000) is a Russian football player.

Club career
He made his debut in the Russian Football National League for FC Yenisey Krasnoyarsk on 17 October 2021 in a game against FC Krasnodar-2.

References

External links
 
 
 Profile by Russian Football National League

2000 births
Sportspeople from Krasnoyarsk
Living people
Russian footballers
Association football midfielders
FC Yenisey Krasnoyarsk players
Russian Second League players
Russian First League players